Schistura reticulofasciata is a species of ray-finned fish, a stone loach, in the genus Schistura. It is found in streams with pebble beds in the Jaintia Hills in the Indian state of Meghalaya, India, part of the drainage of the Brahmaputra. It is traded in the aquarium trade and it is thought to be collected for this trade unsustainably and may also be threatened by habitat loss caused by deforestation.

References

R
Fish described in 1982
Taxa named by Petre Mihai Bănărescu